The following is a list of dams in Fukui Prefecture, Japan.

List

See also

References 

 
Fukui